Pleasure is the sole studio album by Girls at Our Best!, released in 1981 by Happy Birthday Records. It reached No. 60 in the UK Albums Chart.

Reception 
A retrospective AllMusic review described the album as an "underrated delight" and compared the sound to Siouxsie and the Banshees and Gang of Four. Another, by the Louder Than War website, described it as "short, spikey pop" and a "well-crafted album".

Track listing 
"Pleasure"
"Too Big for Your Boots"
"I'm Beautiful Now"
"Waterbed Babies"
"Fun-City Teenagers"
"£600,000"
"Heaven"
"China Blue"
"Fast Boyfriends"
"She Flipped"
"Goodbye to That Jazz"

References

External links 
 
 Album lyrics

1981 debut albums
Girls at Our Best! albums